An election was held on November 7, 1939 for the members of the New York City Council. Although the results of the election were not in by the next day, The Brooklyn Citizen was willing to predict that all the candidates endorsed by Judge Samuel Seabury and Mayor Fiorello H. La Guardia were defeated as they had been in the other municipal contests that day, due in large part to the domestic popularity of President Franklin D. Roosevelt. The reduced turnout compared to 1937 threatened to wipe out at least 9 of the Council's then-26 seats, given that 75,000 votes were required for each seat.

References

New York City Council
New York City Council
Council election
New York City Council elections
New York City Council election